Annavra Makkalu is a 1996 Indian Kannada-language action drama film directed by Phani Ramachandra and produced by Y. R. Jayaraj. The film stars Shiva Rajkumar, in triple roles for the first time in his career, along with Maheswari, Reman Singh  and Suneha, all making their debuts,. The film's score and the soundtrack were scored by Rajesh Ramanath and the stunts were choreographed by Thriller Manju.

Cast

Plot
Triplets of the famous DCP Annayya get separated at birth and come together after many years to fight the villains who were responsible for their father's death.

Soundtrack 
The soundtrack of the film was composed by Rajesh Ramanath.

References 

1996 films
1990s Kannada-language films
Indian action comedy films
Films about siblings
Films directed by Phani Ramachandra
1996 action comedy films
Films scored by Rajesh Ramnath